Bruno Giuliano Gutiérrez Vilches (born 25 July 2002) is a Chilean footballer who currently plays for Colo-Colo as a defender.

Club career
Gutiérrez started his career with Colo-Colo, Chile's most successful team. For 2020, he was sent on loan to Brazilian side Esporte Clube Bahia but soon returned to Colo-Colo at the request of head coach Gustavo Quinteros and due to the COVID-19 pandemic in Brazil. So, in November 2020 he was loaned to Chilean Primera División side Deportes Iquique until the end of the 2020 season, where he made his professional debut. Back in Colo-Colo, he made his debut at senior level in a match against Ñublense on May 1, 2021.

International career
At early age, he represented Chile at under-15 level in the 2017 South American U-15 Championship and Chile U17 at the 2019 FIFA U-17 World Cup, playing three matches. In addition, he represented Chile U20 in a friendly tournament played in Teresópolis (Brazil) called Granja Comary International Tournament, playing two matches against Bolivia U20 and Brazil U20.

Later, he was called up to the first training microcycle of the Chile senior team on 2021. In June 2022, he was called up to the future projection team into the Chile squad for both the match against South Korea and the Kirin Cup Soccer.

He represented Chile at under-23 level in a 1–0 win against Peru U23 on 31 August 2022, in the context of preparations for the 2023 Pan American Games.

References

External links

 Bruno Gutiérrez at playmakerstats.com (English version of ceroacero.es)

2002 births
Living people
People from Quillota Province
Chilean footballers
Chile youth international footballers
Chile under-20 international footballers
Association football defenders
Colo-Colo footballers
Deportes Iquique footballers
Chilean Primera División players
Expatriate footballers in Brazil
Chilean expatriate sportspeople in Brazil